The quack Miranda warning is a term used by skeptics to describe the text which the Dietary Supplement Health and Education Act of 1994 (DSHEA) requires that all labels and marketing materials for products sold as dietary supplements carry, in boldface type:

These statements have not been evaluated by the Food and Drug Administration. This product is not intended to diagnose, treat, cure or prevent any disease.

The name is a reference to the Miranda warning used by law enforcement agencies. It is also used by websites selling a variety of alternative medicine products and unproven devices.

See also
 Safe harbor (law)
 Nutrition facts label

References

Alternative medicine
Medical slang